Jagdszenen aus Niederbayern may refer to:
 Jagdszenen aus Niederbayern (play), a 1965 play
 Hunting Scenes from Bavaria, a 1969 film based on the play